East Linton railway station served the village of East Linton in Scotland between 1846 and 1964. It was on the main line of the North British Railway.

History
One of the original stations was Linton, which was flanked by  towards Edinburgh and  towards Berwick. The initial service was of five trains each way on weekdays, and two on Sundays.

The main line ran roughly east–west through Linton.  station, between Drem and Linton, opened 1848. Linton station was renamed East Linton in December 1864.

Facilities
In 1904 the station was able to handle all classes of traffic (goods, passengers, parcels, wheeled vehicles, livestock, etc.) and there was a goods crane capable of lifting .

Maps of the period show that East Linton station had platforms on both sides of the double-track main line which were linked by a footbridge; the station building was on the southern (westbound) platform; the goods yard with its crane was on the south side of the main line on the western side of the station. The maps also show long sidings each side of the line to the west of the station, a goods shed and weighing machine in the goods yard, a signal box opposite the goods shed and several signals.

Decline and closure
Unlike Drem and Dunbar, both East Linton and East Fortune were listed for closure in the first Beeching report, and duly closed on 4 May 1964.

The future
A study published in 2013 proposed that East Linton and  stations be reopened.
When Abellio ScotRail took over the franchise in April 2015, they committed to reopening both stations as part of the local Berwick service by December 2016. Although Scottish Government and local authority funding was secured, a decision was taken between Transport Scotland and East Lothian Council to integrate the construction of East Linton Railway Station within a larger programme of works in the next rail investment period of 2019 to 2024.

Contractors started survey work in early 2020 at the proposed site of the station, which is further west of the old station site.

Plans for the railway station were published in October 2020 with plans submitted in early 2021. East Lothian Council's planning committee approved the proposals which will see a station open in the village of East Linton for the first time in more than half a century.

The plans for East Linton will see the construction of a two-platform station on the East Coast mainline, with 128 car parking spaces. The station itself will be fully accessible with lifts and a footbridge connecting both platforms. The Full Plans have been released by Network Rail.

Preparatory work started in November 2021 with main construction work starting in February 2022 and a scheduled completion date of March 2024.

Notes

References

External links
East Linton Station on navigable 1949 O.S. map
Photographs of East Linton at Railscot

Disused railway stations in East Lothian
Former North British Railway stations
Railway stations in Great Britain opened in 1846
Railway stations in Great Britain closed in 1964
Beeching closures in Scotland
1846 establishments in Scotland
East Linton
Proposed railway stations in Scotland